Pablo Ricchetti (born January 2, 1977 in Buenos Aires) is an Argentine footballer and current head coach of Santamarina.

Career

South America
Ricchetti began his soccer career in 1985 at the age of seven when he joined the youth-system of famed-Argentine club River Plate. He stayed with the club for 14 years making his first appearance with the first team in February 1996.  In 1998, Ricchetti was transferred to Colón, also of the Argentine First Division, where he played for two seasons before being transferred to Real Valladolid of the Spanish First Division in 2000.  Pablo played 110 games with Real Valladolid through 2005.  After a brief stint with Italian team Ternana, he returned to Argentina playing one season for Quilmes in 2006.

North America
Ricchetti signed with FC Dallas on April 5, 2007 and made his MLS debut on May 12, 2007.  He started all 19 games he appeared in and was named captain for three games.  The team was 10-7-2 when Ricchetti was in the starting lineup and 3-5-3 without.  In 2008, Ricchetti made 25 starts and was third on the team for minutes played with 2,252.  Ricchetti was voted the team’s Defender of the Year for 2008 by members of the local media and was recognized as FC Dallas’ Humanitarian of the Year for his charitable contributions to the community.

Richetti is now playing in NTPSA Men's 30A division with Azzurri and with Westham F.C. in the O-30A at the Soccer Spectrum.

Coaching career
In the 2010-11 season, Richetti was the head coach of Andromeda FC's U10 team in Texas while playing for FC Dallas. After retiring at the end of 2012, Ricchetti started working for the United States Soccer Federation, where he was analyzing opponent teams and players. In 2014, Richetti was hired as a collaborator to Oscar Pareja's coaching staff at FC Dallas. He then moved back to Argentina in 2015 to work as a opponent analyst for Boca Juniors.

In January 2016, Richetti was hired as Jorge Almirón's assistant coach at Lanús. Richetti also worked as Almirón's assistant in Colombia at Atlético Nacional (2018) and later at San Lorenzo (November 2018 to May 2019).

On 23 December 2019, Richetti was appointed head coach of Primera B Nacional team Santamarina.

References

External links
 MLS player profile
 Argentine Primera statistics
Guardian statistics

1977 births
Living people
Footballers from Buenos Aires
Argentine footballers
Argentine expatriate footballers
Club Atlético River Plate footballers
Club Atlético Colón footballers
La Liga players
Real Valladolid players
Quilmes Atlético Club footballers
FC Dallas players
Ternana Calcio players
Serie B players
Argentine expatriate sportspeople in Italy
Argentine expatriate sportspeople in Spain
Argentine expatriate sportspeople in Venezuela
Argentine expatriate sportspeople in the United States
Expatriate footballers in Italy
Expatriate footballers in Spain
Expatriate footballers in Venezuela
Expatriate soccer players in the United States
Major League Soccer players
Association football midfielders
Argentine football managers
FC Dallas non-playing staff